The 1926 Georgia Bulldogs football team represented the Georgia Bulldogs of the University of Georgia during the 1926 college football season. The Bulldogs completed the season with a 5–4 record.  This season included Georgia's fifth straight loss to Alabama and fourth straight loss to Yale. Down 13 to 0 at the half, Georgia came back to beat Georgia Tech. Herdis McCrary and captain George Morton made the touchdowns.

Schedule

References

Georgia
Georgia Bulldogs football seasons
Georgia Bulldogs football